The Badulla Municipal Council is the local council for Badulla, the capital city of Uva Province. The council was first formed as a Town Council which was established in the 1933 and was upgraded to Municipal Council status in 1963. Badulla Municipal Council is considered one of the oldest Municipal Councils in the Sri Lanka.

Representation 
The Badulla Municipal Council is divided into 13 wards and is represented by 15 councillors, elected using an open list proportional representation system. Wards those belong to the Badulla Municipal Council are listed below.

Medapathana
Kailagoda
Badulla North
Pitawelagama
Badulla West
Katupelella
Badulla Central
Badulupitiya
Badulla East
Hindagoda
Badulla South
Hingurugamuwa
Kanupelella

2011 Local government election 
Results of the local government election held on 8 October 2011.

References

External links 
Sri Lanka Telecom Pura Varuna - Badulla Municipal Council

Municipal councils of Sri Lanka
Badulla